Cedar Point National Wildlife Refuge was established in 1964 when the owners of the Cedar Point Shooting Club donated the land to the United States Fish and Wildlife Service. The largest one is almost , it is the largest contiguous marsh in Ohio’s Lake Erie marshes.

This refuge is mostly closed off to the public, but between June and August, about 40 acres are open for fishing. Cedar Point National Wildlife Refuge is managed by the staff from Ottawa National Wildlife Refuge out in Oak Harbor, Ohio which is located off of Route 2. The purpose was to maintain the natural wildlife population on balance with the habitat available while decreasing and limiting exotic plant and animal species. This refuge is not to be used as a public park, campground or picnic area.

Wildlife
This land provides an ideal habitat area for migratory birds and also is called home for other wildlife. There is an extraordinary amount of wildlife that can be seen at Cedar Point. From aquatic life to waterfowl, to small rodents to large bird such as bald eagles. The only way to be able to experience Cedar Point National Wildlife Refuge is if you were to go on a Blue Goose Bus Tour, provided by the Ottawa visitor center, see their website here for more details. While on the tour visitors have been able to see as up to 20 bald eagles. Native millet and smartweed provide an excellent food source for migrating waterfowl.

History 
Prior to being owned by the shooting club, in 1813 a group of men, women, and children used it as a point of shelter after coming from Michigan across the frozen Lake Erie, to escape the River Raisin Massacre, which was a series of conflicts in the Michigan territory from January 18–23, 1813 during the War of 1812. This war was between the United States and British/Native American alliance by the River Raisin, Frenchtown is now known as Monroe, Michigan.

References

National Wildlife Refuges in Ohio
Protected areas established in 1964
Protected areas of Lucas County, Ohio
Wetlands of Ohio
Landforms of Lucas County, Ohio
1964 establishments in Ohio